The genus name Obrima has been used for moths and spiders:

 Obrima, a genus of moths in the family Erebidae
 Obrima (spider), now classified as Obrimona in the family Linyphiidae